Billice is a village in the Kiğı District, Bingöl Province, Turkey. The village is populated by Kurds of non-tribal affiliation and had a population of 120 in 2021.

The hamlets of Akçalı, Altındiş, Düzağaç, Gedikli, Hışman, Karınca, Kurşunlu, Kuşluca, Mugan yaylası, Sakasor yaylası, Solmaz, Taşağıl and Uzundal are attached to the village.

References 

Villages in Kiğı District
Kurdish settlements in Bingöl Province